Chasm: The Rift (also known as Chasm: The Shadow Zone) is a first-person shooter video game developed by Action Forms and published in 1997 by Megamedia. Action Forms would later develop the Carnivores series. The game was meant to compete with Quake a year earlier, since GT Interactive lost publishing rights to Activision when id Software signed with the latter.

Gameplay
The player takes on the role of an unnamed commando whose mission is to stop the so-called "Timestrikers", mutant beings invading different time epochs, from taking over Earth. On this mission, he visits various locations ranging from military bases in the present to tombs in ancient Egypt. All of the levels involve dark corridors, often like those of catacombs and crypts.

One of the most notable features of the game was the ability to remove limbs from enemies.

Plot
The Timestrikers, an alien species, begin a sudden invasion of Earth through the creation of multiple time rifts across the planet.

The protagonist, an unnamed commando, volunteers to aid in efforts to repel the Timestrikers, with his first mission being to investigate a recent attack on a power plant and to bring it back into operation.

Though successful, the Timestrikers soon after launch an attack on a military installation. Along with mutating its guards and soldiers and adding them to their own forces as well, the Timestrikers hope to seize the base's nuclear warheads.

Assigned to undermine the efforts of the Timestrikers, the commando is able to successfully disable the warheads. Additionally, he recovers a working prototype of a tool used by the aliens to create time channels.

The Timestrikers, during this time, attack the commando's home base and travel to Ancient Egypt, where it is revealed that they have been harnessing the power of the pyramids to supply energy to manipulate time in order to travel through its rifts.

The commando is able to exorcise the Timestrikers' presence in Egypt and discovers, via deciphered ancient manuscripts, that they will appear 33 centuries later in the 11th century.

Giving chase with the aid of the time channel device, he is able to prevent the attack of the Timestrikers from the Middle Ages and soon discovers the chief source of where the time rifts are originating from: the Timestrikers' home dimension.

The commando travels to their dimension and kills the remaining forces there, putting an end to the Timestrikers' invasion.

Additional content
An official add-on for the game adds three new levels along with new monsters. It is available as a free download from the developer's website. The retail CD also contains a level editor.

Reception

Chasm received mixed reviews from critics. While they noted that Chasm had better animation and greater amounts of enemy detail when compared to Quake, the lack of a true 3D environment left much to be desired.

References

External links

Official website recreated from Effektus (2017)
Chasm: The Rift at MobyGames
Chasm: The Rift review at GameSpot

1997 video games
Ancient Egypt in fiction
DOS games
DOS-only games
First-person shooters
GT Interactive games
Multiplayer and single-player video games
Video games about time travel
Video games developed in Ukraine
Video games set in Egypt
Video games set in the Middle Ages
Video games with 2.5D graphics
WizardWorks games
Action Forms games